Jennifer Risper (born March 11, 1987) is an American professional basketball player.

Playing career

High school
Risper played high school basketball at Canyon Springs. As a senior, she averaged 15.3 points, 6.3 rebounds, 5.3 assists and 3.2 steals. She was named All-Ivy league and All-Riverside County First Team, along with the CIF Division 1A Co-Most Valuable Player. Other honors included Cal-Hi Sports All-State Third Team, and the L.A. Times All-Star Girls Basketball Team and the Press Enterprise First Team. In her junior year, she averaged 20.3 points, 6.7 rebounds, 3.9 assists and 3.6 steals per game. She was integral in leading Canyon Springs to CIF Div. 1A Southern Section Championship, Ivy League championship and runner-up finish in state championship. In her senior year, she led Canyon Springs to a 31–4 overall record including a school record 25-game winning streak and a perfect 10–0 record in the Ivy League. She lettered all four years in basketball and served as team captain for three years. When she was recruited, she selected Vanderbilt over Texas and Oregon State.

Vanderbilt
Risper was a two-time Second Team All-SEC Pick for the Commodores. In her sophomore year, she was Vanderbilt's representative on the 2007–08 SEC Women's Basketball Good Works Team.

Chicago Sky
Risper was selected in the third round, 29th overall, in the 2009 WNBA Draft, by the Chicago Sky. Jennifer Risper’s first WNBA preseason game was a May 22 Sky win over the defending WNBA champion Detroit Shock. Risper played 11 minutes and scored three points.
On May 28, Risper and the Sky played against an Indiana Fever squad including her former teammate, Christina Wirth. In the 67–74 loss, Risper played 9 minutes, had 3 Free Throws, 5 Rebounds, 1 Steal, and 3 points. Before the end of training camp, Risper was cut by the Sky.

Europe
In the fall of 2009, Risper and her former teammate Wirth both signed with a Slovakian team officially known as BK PU Bemaco Prešov. The season is scheduled to end in April 2010.

Indiana Fever
Risper signed a 2010 training camp contract with the Indiana Fever.

Vanderbilt  statistics
Source

Awards and honors
 2008–09 Vanderbilt women's Co-Athletes of the Year 
 Women's Basketball Coaches Association (WBCA), National Defensive Player of the Year (2009)
 SEC All-Tournament Team (2009)
 SEC All-Defensive Team (2008)
 Second-team All-Southeastern Conference honoree (2008)
Vanderbilt Thanksgiving All-Tournament Team (2008).
All-tournament honors at the 2007 Contra Costa Times in Berkeley, California
All-tournament selection (2007 Vanderbilt Thanksgiving Tournament.)
Female Newcomer of the Year honors among all Vanderbilt student-athletes (2006)

References

1987 births
Living people
American women's basketball players
Basketball players from California
Chicago Sky draft picks
People from Moreno Valley, California
Vanderbilt Commodores women's basketball players